Paralitherium was an early sea cow from the late Eocene of Hungary (Felsotarkany).

Etymology 
The species name tarkanyense honors Felsotarkany, Hungary, where the type specimen was collected.

See also 
 Evolution of sirenians

References 

Eocene sirenians
Priabonian life
Eocene mammals of Europe
Fossils of Hungary
Fossil taxa described in 1977
Prehistoric placental genera